The term flyback may refer to:

Flyback chronograph, a single-push-button clock for stopping, resetting and restarting time measurement
Flyback converter, a type of DC to DC converter
Flyback diode, also known as a “freewheel diode”, a used to protect against spikes from inductive loads
Flyback transformer, used to drive cathode ray tubes
FlyBack, an open source backup utility